Borisov or Borisova may refer to:

Places
 Barysaw, or Borisov, Belarus
 Borisov Arena, a football stadium
 Battle of Borisov, 1812
 Borisov, Volgograd Oblast, Russia
 Borišov, a mountain in Slovakia
 Borisova, Perm Krai, Russia
 Borisova gradina, a park in Sofia

Other uses
 Borisov (name), and Borisova, a surname, including a list of people with the name
 2I/Borisov, an interstellar comet 
 C/2014 Q3 (Borisov), a periodic comet

See also

 Borisovka, the name of several inhabited localities in Russia
 Borisovo (disambiguation)
 Borisovsky (disambiguation)